The slender sorcerer (Saurenchelys cancrivora) is an eel in the family Nettastomatidae (duckbill/witch eels). It was described by Wilhelm Peters in 1864. It is a marine, tropical eel which is known from the eastern Atlantic and Indian Ocean, including the River Congo and the Mediterranean.

References

Nettastomatidae
Fish described in 1864
Taxa named by Wilhelm Peters